Swinging with the Finkels is a 2011 British comedy film directed by Jonathan Newman and starring Mandy Moore, Martin Freeman and Melissa George. The screenplay concerns a wealthy London couple who decide to take up "swinging" (as in "partner swapping") in an attempt to save their struggling marriage. The film was picked up by Freestyle Releasing and had a limited release date in the United States on 26 August 2011.

Cast
 Martin Freeman as Alvin Finkel 
 Mandy Moore as Ellie Finkel 
 Melissa George as Janet 
 Jonathan Silverman as Peter 
 Richard Shelton as Trevor (original)
 Jerry Stiller as Mr. Winters
 Angus Deayton as Richard
 Edward Akrout as Andrew
 John Barrard as Old Man
 Paul Chowdhry as Henry

Production notes
The 2011 film was based on Sex with the Finkels (2008), an original short film also from director Jonathan Newman.

The film reportedly served as a vehicle for co-star Mandy Moore to extend her acting range beyond "good girl" roles.

Reception

References

External links
 

British comedy films
Films directed by Jonathan Newman
2011 comedy films
2011 films
Films shot in Cambridgeshire
2010s English-language films
2010s British films